Karen Ward (born 5 May 1966) is a Canadian swimmer. She competed in the women's 800 metre freestyle at the 1984 Summer Olympics.

References

External links
 

1966 births
Living people
Canadian female freestyle swimmers
Olympic swimmers of Canada
Swimmers at the 1984 Summer Olympics
Swimmers from Montreal